Chlorine dioxide is a chemical compound with the formula ClO2 that exists as yellowish-green gas above 11 °C, a reddish-brown liquid between 11 °C and −59 °C, and as bright orange crystals below −59 °C. It is usually handled as an aqueous solution.  It is also commonly used as a bleach. More recent developments have extended its applications in food processing and as a disinfectant.

Structure and bonding 

The molecule ClO2 has an odd number of valence electrons, and therefore, it is a paramagnetic radical. It is an unusual "example of an odd-electron molecule which
is stable towards dimerization" (nitric oxide being another example).

In 1933, Lawrence O. Brockway, a graduate student of Linus Pauling, proposed a structure that involved a three-electron bond and two single bonds. However, Pauling in his General Chemistry shows a double bond to one oxygen and a single bond plus a three-electron bond to the other. The valence bond structure would be represented as the resonance hybrid depicted by Pauling. The three-electron bond represents a bond that is weaker than the double bond. In molecular orbital theory this idea is commonplace if the third electron is placed in an anti-bonding orbital. Later work has confirmed that the highest occupied molecular orbital is indeed an incompletely-filled antibonding orbital.

The crystal structure of ClO2 is orthorhombic, and displays the symmetry of the Pbca space group.

Preparation 
Chlorine dioxide was first prepared in 1811 by Sir Humphry Davy.

Chlorine dioxide is a compound that can decompose violently when separated from diluting substances. As a result, preparation methods that involve producing solutions of it without going through a gas-phase stage are often preferred.

Oxidation of chlorite 
In the laboratory, ClO2 can be prepared by oxidation of sodium chlorite with chlorine:

Traditionally, chlorine dioxide for disinfection applications has been made from sodium chlorite or the sodium chlorite–hypochlorite method:

or the sodium chlorite–hydrochloric acid method:

or the chlorite–sulfuric acid method:

All three methods can produce chlorine dioxide with high chlorite conversion yield. Unlike the other processes, the chlorite–sulfuric acid method is completely chlorine-free, although it suffers from the requirement of 25% more chlorite to produce an equivalent amount of chlorine dioxide. Alternatively, hydrogen peroxide may be efficiently used in small-scale applications.

Addition of sulfuric acid or any strong acid to chlorate salts produces chlorine dioxide.

Reduction of chlorate 
In the laboratory, chlorine dioxide can also be prepared by reaction of potassium chlorate with oxalic acid:

or with oxalic and sulfuric acid:

Over 95% of the chlorine dioxide produced in the world today is made by reduction of sodium chlorate, for use in pulp bleaching. It is produced with high efficiency in a strong acid solution with a suitable reducing agent such as methanol, hydrogen peroxide, hydrochloric acid or sulfur dioxide. Modern technologies are based on methanol or hydrogen peroxide, as these chemistries allow the best economy and do not co-produce elemental chlorine. The overall reaction can be written as:

As a typical example, the reaction of sodium chlorate with hydrochloric acid in a single reactor is believed to proceed through the following pathway:

which gives the overall reaction 

The commercially more important production route uses methanol as the reducing agent and sulfuric acid for the acidity. Two advantages of not using the chloride-based processes are that there is no formation of elemental chlorine, and that sodium sulfate, a valuable chemical for the pulp mill, is a side-product. These methanol-based processes provide high efficiency and can be made very safe.

The variant process using sodium chlorate, hydrogen peroxide and sulfuric acid has been increasingly used since 1999 for water treatment and other small-scale disinfection applications, since it produce a chlorine-free product at high efficiency, over 95%.

Other processes 
Very pure chlorine dioxide can also be produced by electrolysis of a chlorite solution:

High-purity chlorine dioxide gas (7.7% in air or nitrogen) can be produced by the gas–solid method, which reacts dilute chlorine gas with solid sodium chlorite:

Handling properties 
At partial pressures above  (or gas-phase concentrations greater than 10% volume in air at STP) of ClO2 may explosively decompose into chlorine and oxygen. The decomposition can be initiated by light, hot spots, chemical reaction, or pressure shock. Thus, chlorine dioxide is never handled as a pure gas, but is almost always handled in an aqueous solution in concentrations between 0.5 to 10 grams per liter. Its solubility increases at lower temperatures, so it is common to use chilled water (5 °C, 41 °F) when storing at concentrations above 3 grams per liter. In many countries, such as the United States, chlorine dioxide may not be transported at any concentration and is instead almost always produced on-site. In some countries, chlorine dioxide solutions below 3 grams per liter in concentration may be transported by land, but they are relatively unstable and deteriorate quickly.

Uses
Chlorine dioxide is used for bleaching of wood pulp and for the disinfection (called chlorination) of municipal drinking water, treatment of water in oil and gas applications, disinfection in the food industry, microbiological control in cooling towers, and textile bleaching. As a disinfectant, it is effective even at low concentrations because of its unique qualities.

Bleaching 
Chlorine dioxide is sometimes used for bleaching of wood pulp in combination with chlorine, but it is used alone in ECF (elemental chlorine-free) bleaching sequences. It is used at moderately acidic pH (3.5 to 6). The use of chlorine dioxide minimizes the amount of organochlorine compounds produced. Chlorine dioxide (ECF technology) currently is the most important bleaching method worldwide. About 95% of all bleached kraft pulp is made using chlorine dioxide in ECF bleaching sequences.

Chlorine dioxide has been used to bleach flour.

Water treatment 

The water treatment plant at Niagara Falls, New York first used chlorine dioxide for drinking water treatment in 1944 for destroying "taste and odor producing phenolic compounds." Chlorine dioxide was introduced as a drinking water disinfectant on a large scale in 1956, when Brussels, Belgium, changed from chlorine to chlorine dioxide. Its most common use in water treatment is as a pre-oxidant prior to chlorination of drinking water to destroy natural water impurities that would otherwise produce trihalomethanes upon exposure to free chlorine. Trihalomethanes are suspected carcinogenic disinfection by-products associated with chlorination of naturally occurring organics in raw water. Chlorine dioxide also produces 70% fewer halomethanes in the presence of natural organic matter compared to when elemental chlorine or bleach is used.

Chlorine dioxide is also superior to chlorine when operating above pH 7, in the presence of ammonia and amines, and for the control of biofilms in water distribution systems. Chlorine dioxide is used in many industrial water treatment applications as a biocide, including cooling towers, process water, and food processing.

Chlorine dioxide is less corrosive than chlorine and superior for the control of Legionella bacteria.
Chlorine dioxide is superior to some other secondary water disinfection methods, in that chlorine dioxide is not negatively impacted by pH, does not lose efficacy over time, because the bacteria will not grow resistant to it), and is not negatively impacted by silica and phosphates, which are commonly used potable water corrosion inhibitors. In the United States, it is an EPA-registered biocide.

It is more effective as a disinfectant than chlorine in most circumstances against waterborne pathogenic agents such as viruses, bacteria, and protozoa – including the cysts of Giardia and the oocysts of Cryptosporidium.

The use of chlorine dioxide in water treatment leads to the formation of the by-product chlorite, which is currently limited to a maximum of 1 part per million in drinking water in the USA. This EPA standard limits the use of chlorine dioxide in the US to relatively high-quality water, because this minimizes chlorite concentration, or water that is to be treated with iron-based coagulants, because iron can reduce chlorite to chloride. The World Health Organization also advises a 1ppm dosification.

Use in public crises 
Chlorine dioxide has many applications as an oxidizer or disinfectant. Chlorine dioxide can be used for air disinfection and was the principal agent used in the decontamination of buildings in the United States after the 2001 anthrax attacks. After the disaster of Hurricane Katrina in New Orleans, Louisiana, and the surrounding Gulf Coast, chlorine dioxide was used to eradicate dangerous mold from houses inundated by the flood water.

In addressing the COVID-19 pandemic, the U.S. Environmental Protection Agency has posted a list of many disinfectants that meet its criteria for use in environmental measures against the causative coronavirus. Some are based on sodium chlorite that is activated into chlorine dioxide, though differing formulations are used in each product. Many other products on the EPA list contain sodium hypochlorite, which is similar in name but should not be confused with sodium chlorite because they have very different modes of chemical action.

Other disinfection uses 
Chlorine dioxide may be used as a fumigant treatment to "sanitize" fruits such as blueberries, raspberries, and strawberries that develop molds and yeast.

Chlorine dioxide may be used to disinfect poultry by spraying or immersing it after slaughtering.

Chlorine dioxide may be used for the disinfection of endoscopes, such as under the trade name Tristel. It is also available in a trio consisting of a preceding pre-clean with surfactant and a succeeding rinse with deionized water and a low-level antioxidant.

Chlorine dioxide may be used for control of zebra and quagga mussels in water intakes.

Chlorine dioxide was shown to be effective in bedbug eradication.

For water purification during camping, disinfecting tablets containing chlorine dioxide are more effective against pathogens than those using household bleach, but typically cost more.

Other uses 
Chlorine dioxide is used as an oxidant for destroying phenols in wastewater streams and for odor control in the air scrubbers of animal byproduct (rendering) plants. It is also available for use as a deodorant for cars and boats, in chlorine dioxide-generating packages that are activated by water and left in the boat or car overnight.

Safety issues in water and supplements 
Potential hazards with chlorine dioxide include poisoning and the risk of spontaneous ignition or explosion on contact with flammable materials.

Chlorine dioxide is toxic, and limits on human exposure are required to ensure its safe use. The United States Environmental Protection Agency has set a maximum level of 0.8 mg/L for chlorine dioxide in drinking water. The Occupational Safety and Health Administration (OSHA), an agency of the United States Department of Labor, has set an 8-hour permissible exposure limit of 0.1 ppm in air (0.3 mg/m3) for people working with chlorine dioxide.

Chlorine dioxide has been fraudulently and illegally marketed as an ingestible cure for a wide range of diseases, including childhood autism and coronavirus. Children who have been given enemas of chlorine dioxide as a supposed cure for childhood autism have suffered life-threatening ailments. The U.S. Food and Drug Administration (FDA) has stated that ingestion or other internal use of chlorine dioxide, outside of supervised oral rinsing using dilute concentrations, has no health benefits of any kind, and it should not be used internally for any reason.

Pseudomedicine 

On 30 July and 1 October 2010, the United States Food and Drug Administration warned against the use of the product "Miracle Mineral Supplement", or "MMS", which when prepared according to the instructions produces chlorine dioxide. MMS has been marketed as a treatment for a variety of conditions, including HIV, cancer, autism, acne, and, more recently, COVID-19. Many have complained to the FDA, reporting life-threatening reactions, and even death. The FDA has warned consumers that MMS can cause serious harm to health, and stated that it has received numerous reports of nausea, diarrhea, severe vomiting, and life-threatening low blood pressure caused by dehydration. This warning was repeated for a third time on 12 August 2019, and a fourth on 8 April 2020, stating that ingesting MMS is just as hazardous as ingesting bleach, and urging consumers not to use them or give these products to their children for any reason, as there is no scientific evidence showing that chlorine dioxide has any beneficial medical properties.

References

External links

Chlorine oxides
Bleaches
Disinfectants
Free radicals
Gases with color
Explosive gases
Explosive chemicals